Geca Kon also spelled Gaetz Kohn (2 August 1873 – 1941) was a Serbian publisher.

Early life
Kon was born in Csongrád. His father was a rich rabbi and was the director of an elementary school. Unable to complete school, Kon moved to Belgrade in 1889. In Belgrade, he found work in the bookshop owned by Frederick Breslauer. He worked in the shop until 1894, then moved to Novi Sad, staying there for a year.

Publishing career
In 1901 he established a bookselling and publishing business which soon became the largest in Yugoslavia. From his premises in Belgrade he published over 3,500 books before his business was closed in 1941 with the Axis Invasion of Yugoslavia.

In 1906 he began publishing the journal Archives of Law and Social Sciences. The first catalogue of books of his publications Gece Kona came out in 1910. The catalogue contained 50 books, a selection that included many famous Serbian writers, including Mihailo Gavrilović, Slobodan Jovanović, Toma Živanović, Stojan Novaković and Gojko Niketić.

He was attacked for being Jewish in the anti-semitic journal Balkan and arrested when the German army arrived in Belgrade.

Marriage and family
Kon married Elsa Wiles in 1902. They had two daughters, Elvira and Malvina.

References

1873 births
1941 deaths
People from Csongrád
Serbian publishers (people)
Serbian Jews
Serbian Jews who died in the Holocaust
19th-century Jews